Karl Ludwig Lehrs (January 14, 1802 – June 9, 1878), was a German classical scholar.

Born at Königsberg, he was Jewish, but in 1822 he converted to Christianity. In 1845 he was appointed professor of ancient Greek philology at Königsberg University, a post he held until his death.

Work
His most important works are:
De Aristarchi Studiis Homericis (1833), which laid a new foundation for Homeric exegesis (on the Aristarchean lines of explaining Homer from the text itself) and textual criticism.
Quaestiones Epicae (1837).
De Asclepiade Myrleano (1845).
Herodiani Scripta Tria emendatiora. Accedunt Analecta (1848).
Populäre Aufsätze aus dem Altertum (1856, Second much enlarged edition, 1875), his best known work.
Horatius Flaccus (1869), in which, on aesthetic grounds, he rejected many of the odes as spurious.
Die Pindarscholien (1873).
Lehrs was a man of decided opinions; his enthusiasm for everything Greek caused him to insist on the undivided authorship of the Iliad; comparative mythology and the symbolical interpretation of myths he regarded as a species of sacrilege.

Notes

References 
 

19th-century German writers
19th-century German male writers
German classical scholars
Academic staff of the University of Königsberg
Converts to Christianity from Judaism
19th-century German Jews
Levites
Writers from Königsberg
1802 births
1878 deaths